Erwin "Doe" Dornau (22 March 1926 – 23 September 2008) was an Australian rules footballer who played with South Melbourne in the Victorian Football League (VFL) during the late 1940s and early 1950s. Dornau was the first born and bred Queenslander in VFL/AFL history. Papers of the time spelled his first name as Irwin. What looked like a promising VFL career was cut short by leg injury. Though he was consistently among South's best talls and was named deputy captain in 1952, his last year at the club.

Early life
Dornau was born in Brisbane, Queensland and attended Windsor State School, one of just 42 schools in the state where Australian rules was played. He first picked up the sport there being one of the very few children in the state who did not go on to play rugby, instead choosing to stick with Australian rules.

QANFL and State representation

Dornau played his senior football at Kedron where he was a standout centre half back who could kick equally well on either foot.

He represented Queensland at interstate football for the first time in 1946 and starred for them at centre half back in the 1947 Hobart Carnival, finishing equal second in the Tassie Medal. He also won the Col Loel-Mick Byles trophy as best player in the QANFL.

VFL career
His efforts in Hobart saw him recruited to South Melbourne in 1948 at the age of 21 and he after 3 months residency in Melbourne qualified to transfer leagues making way for his debut on the half back flank against Richmond. He was named best on ground for South's in their match against Footscray.

His debut season was solid gaining eight Brownlow votes. However he suffered a serious knee injury that saw him sidelined for two seasons.

Upon return from injury in 1951, the club rested him in the ruck where he shared the position with Don Scott. However he soon sustained further injuries to his thigh and hand His return to full fitness saw him take Ron Clegg's position at Centre Half Back however it was short lived with recurring injuries seeing him switched to the full back position. His leg injuries eventually put an end to his 1952 season and his VFL career.

After years of injury struggles, Dornau resigned from Souths despite being named South's deputy captain in his final season.

Personal life
Following his VFL career, Dornau took up a position as player coach at the Leeton Football Club at Leeton in New South Wales Riverina.

Dornau died on 23 September 2008.

Footnotes

References
 Harms, J., "'Doe' who bucked the trend up north", The Age, (14 June 2003).
 Holmesby, Russell and Main, Jim (2007). The Encyclopedia of AFL Footballers. 7th ed. Melbourne: Bas Publishing.

External links
 
 

1926 births
2008 deaths
Australian rules footballers from Queensland
Australian Rules footballers: place kick exponents
Kedron Football Club players
Sydney Swans players
Sportspeople from Brisbane